The 1894 Wyoming gubernatorial election was held on November 6, 1894. Democratic Governor John E. Osborne, first elected in the 1892 special election, declined to seek re-election to a second term, instead aiming to be elected to the U.S. Senate. In part because of a backlash against the Democratic Party owing to the Panic of 1893, Republicans won the governorship back from the Democrats, and would hold onto it until 1914.

Party conventions
The Democratic Party nominated State Senator William H. Holliday to succeed Osborne, and adopted a free silver platform, favoring the coinage of silver at a ratio of 16 to 1. The Republican Party nominated William A. Richards, the Surveyor General for Wyoming and a former Johnson County Commissioner, by acclamation. Its platform concurred with the Democratic Party's on free silver coinage at the same ratio and "refer[red] to the history of the past nineteen months as indicating the unfitness of democrats to rule the country[.]"

Meanwhile, the Populist Party, which had fused with the Democratic Party in several past elections in Wyoming, declined to do so again in 1894, and nominated for Governor Lewis C. Tidball, who served as Speaker of the Wyoming House of Representatives from 1893 to 1895 under the Democratic-Populist fusion majority.

General election

Results

References

1894 Wyoming elections
1894
Wyoming